The iċ-Ċnus to tal-Bardan Cliffs Important Bird Area comprises a 19 ha linear strip of cliffed coastline in Munxar and Sannat, on the southern coast of the island of Gozo, part of the Maltese islands. Its steep and rugged cliffs rise from sea level to a height of 128 m. It was identified as an Important Bird Area (IBA) by BirdLife International because it supports 30 breeding pairs of yelkouan shearwaters.

See also
 List of birds of Malta

References

Seabird colonies
Important Bird Areas of Malta
Munxar
Sannat
Cliffs of Malta